William Edward Whitby (July 29, 1943 –  March 12, 2016) was an American professional baseball player, a right-handed pitcher who appeared in four games in Major League Baseball for the Minnesota Twins during the 1964 season. He signed with the Twins in 1961 after graduating from Victoria High School.

Whitby's MLB audition occurred in the middle of his fourth season in pro baseball. He made four appearances as a relief pitcher, three against the Cleveland Indians and one against the Detroit Tigers. He did not earn a decision and posted an 8.53 earned run average in 6 innings pitched with two strikeouts and one base on balls. Of the six hits he allowed, three were home runs.

During his minor league career, which lasted for ten seasons, nine of them in the Minnesota farm system, he reached double digits in wins three times. Whitby died at age 72 in Huntersville, North Carolina.

External links

1943 births
2016 deaths
Baseball players from Virginia
Charlotte Hornets (baseball) players
Denver Bears players
Florida Instructional League Twins players
Fort Walton Beach Jets players
Major League Baseball pitchers
Minnesota Twins players
People from Crewe, Virginia
Tigres de Aragua players
American expatriate baseball players in Venezuela
Tulsa Oilers (baseball) players
Wilson Tobs players
Wytheville Twins players